Papenfuss (German: Papenfuß) is a surname. It may refer to:

Bert Papenfuß (born 1956), German poet and editor
Tony Papenfuss (born 1950), U.S. actor

See also
Edward C. Papenfuse (born 1943), retired Maryland State Archivist and Commissioner of Land Patents
Eric Papenfuse (born 1971), mayor of Harrisburg, Pennsylvania